Huangtai railway station is a railway station in Licheng District, Jinan, Shandong, China. The station was established in 1904 and the station building was erected in 1905 as part of the German Shandong Railway ("Schantung Eisenbahn"). The station was originally known as "Jinanfu East" ("Tsinanfu-Ost").

Huangtai railway station has been placed on the list of Major historical and cultural sites protected by Shandong Province in 2006 (site number 3-252).

Location
Huangtai railway station is located on Huangtai South Road, on the northern end of Shanda Road and to the south of the Xiaoqing River. The postal address of Huangtai railway station is No.21, Huangtai South Road (黄台南路21号).

See also
List of sites in Jinan
Major historical and cultural sites protected by Shandong Province

References

Transport in Jinan
Railway stations in Shandong
Railway stations in China opened in 1904
Buildings and structures in Jinan